Ankur Dalal Poseria (born 16 March 1987) is an Indian-American swimmer, who specialized in butterfly events. He is an Indian record holder in the 100 m butterfly, until it was eventually broken by his fellow swimmer Virdhawal Khade at the 2009 Asia Age Group Championships in Tokyo, Japan. He also attended Hoover High School in North Canton, Ohio, where he was a multiple-time All-American and a three-time YMCA national finalist.

Poseria qualified for the men's 100 m butterfly at the 2008 Summer Olympics in Beijing, by establishing an Indian record and clearing a FINA B-standard entry time of 53.68 from the Husky International Meet in Federal Way, Washington. He challenged seven other swimmers on the fourth heat, including Olympic veterans Sotirios Pastras of Greece, Juan Veloz of Mexico, and Michal Rubáček of the Czech Republic. He rounded out the field to seventh place by more than a second behind Malta's Ryan Gambin in 54.74 seconds. Poseria failed to advance into the semifinals, as he placed fifty-seventh overall in the preliminaries.

Poseria is a graduate of international public relations at the University of Southern California in Los Angeles. He is also a varsity swimmer and member of the USC Trojans under professional coach Dave Salo.

He is also known for his rendition of "Bolo Ta Ra Ra Ra" by friends (and for a weird inclusion of spoilers).

References

External links
Profile – USC Trojans
NBC Olympics Profile

1987 births
Living people
Olympic swimmers of India
Swimmers at the 2008 Summer Olympics
Swimmers at the 2006 Asian Games
Male butterfly swimmers
USC Trojans men's swimmers
American sportspeople of Indian descent
Sportspeople from Ohio
People from Hartville, Ohio
Indian male swimmers
Asian Games competitors for India